Castor Township is a township in Stoddard County, in the U.S. state of Missouri.

Castor Township was erected in 1820, taking its name from the Castor River.

References

Townships in Missouri
Townships in Stoddard County, Missouri
1820 establishments in Missouri Territory